Hollinger Inc. was a Canadian media company based in Toronto which was established by businessman Conrad Black. At one time, the company was the third-largest media empire in the world. The company went bankrupt in 2007.

History 
Hollinger Inc. was used by Conrad Black as a holding company for his media interests after he acquired control of The Daily Telegraph in 1986. The company took its name from Hollinger Gold Mines, which started in 1909 and later became Hollinger Mines, owner of one of the world's largest gold mines near Timmins, Ontario. It was acquired by E.P. Taylor's conglomerate, Argus Corporation. Black took control of Argus in 1978, and he sold off its assets by 1985.

Hollinger Inc. was controlled by Canadian-based Ravelston Corporation, which was used as a personal holding company by Black. Ravelston was placed in receivership in the summer of 2005.

Holdings 
Hollinger Inc. was the parent company of Chicago-based Hollinger International, whose primary holdings included a group of Chicago newspapers. Its flagship paper was the Chicago Sun-Times. Hollinger also owned The Jerusalem Post and interests in Australian and Canadian newspaper chains. Hollinger's non-Canadian papers were sold to Hollinger International in 1996. In 2000, Hollinger sold its Canadian newspaper, magazine and internet assets to Canwest Global for $3.5 billion. Hollinger became a holding company for stakes in various companies, including its controlling stake in Hollinger International.

The ownership structure of Hollinger and other related companies was described as "complex" and "convoluted."

Demise 
A series of non-competition payments and management fees made between 1999 and 2003 to Black and his associates would later lead to lengthy court and regulatory proceedings.  In 2003 and 2004, Black was removed as owner from Hollinger, and other corporate positions, after there were claims made that he had looted his companies for personal profit. Shareholders learned that the company was facing serious financial problems. Shortly afterward, a number of court and regulatory orders left the company with no income or operating business.

On August 2, 2007, Hollinger filed for bankruptcy protection in Canada and the United States. At the time, the company was 78% owned by Black's company Ravelston. Hollinger continued to assert control over Sun-Media Times Group Inc. Hollinger shares were delisted from the Toronto Stock Exchange in August 2008.

References 

Newspaper companies of Canada
Companies based in Toronto
Defunct publishing companies of Canada
Black family (Canada)
Corporate scandals
Defunct companies of Ontario